Stonefields is a suburb in Auckland, New Zealand, located 8 kilometres southeast of the city centre. Stonefields is surrounded by the suburbs of Mount Wellington, Saint Johns and Glen Innes.

History 
The 100 hectares site of single basalt lava flow from the nearby scoria cone of Maungarei/ Mt Wellington was purchased by Percy Winstone in the mid 1930's. Quarrying began in 1936 and by 1969, the quarry reached a production total of 1 million tonnes per year. When the quarry was worked out by the year 2000, in excess of 35 million tonnes had been produced and used to build the city of Auckland. Once the quarry ceased operations, there was much debate on its future use. A landfill rubbish site was considered and the plan was discarded due to the risk of leachate into ground water. Instead, Stonefields, a housing development was agreed.

The former rock quarry was to be one of the largest blocks of undeveloped land in Auckland, able to take a $1.5 billion housing subdivision for about 8000 people in up to 1000 apartments, 1000 stand-alone houses and 1000 terraced houses. In 2002 New Zealand's Overseas Investment Commission approved the purchase of land surrounding the Mt Wellington quarry by Fletcher Residential. Approval was required as the parent company, Fletcher Building, was more than 25 per cent foreign owned.

Demographics

Stonefields had a population of 3,792 at the 2018 New Zealand census, an increase of 1,749 people (85.6%) since the 2013 census, and an increase of 3,792 people since the 2006 census. There were 1,425 households, comprising 1,782 males and 2,010 females, giving a sex ratio of 0.89 males per female, with 744 people (19.6%) aged under 15 years, 708 (18.7%) aged 15 to 29, 1,857 (49.0%) aged 30 to 64, and 480 (12.7%) aged 65 or older.

Ethnicities were 63.9% European/Pākehā, 3.6% Māori, 1.7% Pacific peoples, 34.3% Asian, and 3.2% other ethnicities. People may identify with more than one ethnicity.

The percentage of people born overseas was 42.6, compared with 27.1% nationally.

Although some people chose not to answer the census's question about religious affiliation, 47.5% had no religion, 36.3% were Christian, 4.4% were Hindu, 2.4% were Muslim, 2.8% were Buddhist and 2.5% had other religions.

Of those at least 15 years old, 1,542 (50.6%) people had a bachelor's or higher degree, and 186 (6.1%) people had no formal qualifications. 1,209 people (39.7%) earned over $70,000 compared to 17.2% nationally. The employment status of those at least 15 was that 1,854 (60.8%) people were employed full-time, 369 (12.1%) were part-time, and 69 (2.3%) were unemployed.

Education

References

Suburbs of Auckland
Ōrākei Local Board Area